In Brussels, there are numerous church buildings, most of which are attached to the Roman Catholic Church. The Brussels-Capital Region is home to 107 Catholic parishes. Other religious buildings in the region are also mentioned.

By municipality

Anderlecht

Audergem/Oudergem

Berchem-Sainte-Agathe/Sint-Agatha-Berchem

City of Brussels

Etterbeek

Evere

Forest/Vorst

Ganshoren

Haren

Ixelles/Elsene

Jette

Koekelberg

Laeken/Laken

Molenbeek-Saint-Jean/Sint-Jans-Molenbeek

Neder-Over-Heembeek

Saint Gilles/Saint-Gillis

Saint-Josse-ten-Node/Sint-Joost-ten-Node

Schaerbeek/Schaarbeek

Uccle/Ukkel

Watermael-Boitsfort/Watermaal-Bosvoorde

Woluwe-Saint-Lambert/Sint-Lambrechts-Woluwe

Woluwe-Saint-Pierre/Sint-Pieters-Woluwe

References

 Church list at kerknet.be
 Angloinfo.com
 ipcbrussels.org

Brussels-related lists
Lists of religious buildings and structures in Belgium
Brussels